Nina Simone at Carnegie Hall is a 1963 album by jazz singer/pianist/songwriter Nina Simone. It is a live album recorded at Simone's first solo appearance at Carnegie Hall in New York City, on April 12, 1963, and was released on Colpix Records.

Track listing
 "Black Swan" (Gian Carlo Menotti)
 "Theme from Samson and Delilah" (instrumental) (Camille Saint-Saëns)
 "If You Knew" (Nina Simone)
 "Theme from Sayonara" (instrumental) (Irving Berlin)
 "The Twelfth of Never" (Jerry Livingston (m), Paul Francis Webster (l))
 "Will I Find My Love Today" (Alex Fogarty (m), Sidney Shaw (l))
 "The Other Woman/Cotton-Eyed Joe" (Jessie Mae Robinson, Nina Simone/Traditional)

Complete 2-CD Set:

This edition combines the original Carnegie Hall album (disc 1) with another album recorded at the same concert, Folksy Nina, plus bonus tracks.

Disc One: 
 "Black Swan" (Gian Carlo Menotti)
 "Theme from Samson and Delilah" (instrumental) (Camille Saint-Saëns)
 "If You Knew" (Nina Simone)
 "Theme from Sayonara" (instrumental) (Irving Berlin)
 "The Twelfth of Never" (Jerry Livingston (m), Paul Francis Webster (l))
 "Will I Find My Love Today" (Alex Fogarty (m), Sidney Shaw (l))
 "The Other Woman/Cotton-Eyed Joe" (Jessie Mae Robinson, Nina Simone/Traditional)
 "Work Song" (Nat Adderley) [Bonus Track]

Disc Two:
 "Silver City Bound" (Alan Lomax, Huddie Ledbetter, John A. Lomax)
 "When I Was a Young Girl" (Sebastian "Billy" Mure)
 "Eratz Zavat Chalav U'dvash" (Eliahu Gamliel)
 "Lass of the Low Country" (Traditional; arranged by Nina Simone)
 "The Young Knight" (Charles Kingsley, Joseph Hathaway)
 "Vaynikehu" (also known as "Israeli Song In 5/4 Time") (Gil Aldema)
 "Mighty Lak' a Rose" (Ethelbert Nevin, Frank Stanton)
 "Hush Little Baby" (Traditional)
 "Little Liza Jane" (Traditional) [Bonus Track]
 "Will I Find a Resting Place?" (Traditional) [Bonus Track]
 "Blackbird" (Herbert Sacker, Nina Simone) [Bonus Track]

Personnel
Nina Simone - vocals, piano
Alvin Schackman, Phil Orlando - guitar
Lisle Atkinson - bass
Montego Joe (Roger Sanders) - drums
The Malcolm Dodds Singers - backing vocals

References

1963 live albums
Nina Simone live albums
Albums arranged by Nina Simone
Colpix Records live albums
Albums recorded at Carnegie Hall